is a subway station on the  Fukuoka City Subway Nanakuma Line in Jōnan-ku, Fukuoka in Japan. Its station symbol is a picture of a plum blossom in pink.

Lines 
Fukuoka City Subway
Nanakuma Line

Platforms

Vicinity
Umebayashinaka Park
Fukuoka University Hospital
Yamato Transport Company
Office of The Times
Umebayashi Kofun

History
February 3, 2005: Opening of the station
December 22, 2005: Elevator closed because of an accident
February 2007: Motorcycle and Bicycle parking area opened

References

Railway stations in Japan opened in 2005
Railway stations in Fukuoka Prefecture
Nanakuma Line